Ousman Joof (born 28 February 2000) is a Gambian footballer who plays for Trayal Kruševac in the Serbian First League.

Club career
Born in Kololi, Marong started playing in Gambia at the Superstars Academy. In the summer of the 2019–20 season, he signed with Serbian club Trayal Kruševac.

International career
Before arriving to Serbia, Marong had already been member of the Gambia U20.

References

External links
 

2000 births
Living people
Association football midfielders
Gambian footballers
Gambian expatriate footballers
FK Trayal Kruševac players
Serbian First League players
Expatriate footballers in Serbia
Gambian expatriates in Serbia
The Gambia under-20 international footballers